Wallace Township is located in LaSalle County, Illinois. As of the 2010 census, its population was 491 and it contained 201 housing units.  Wallace Township was formed from Dayton Township on an unknown date.

Geography

Demographics

References

External links
US Census
City-data.com
Illinois State Archives

Townships in LaSalle County, Illinois
Townships in Illinois